This is a list of specific psychological tests by the effect size for gender as reported in the most recent meta-analysis or norm. Only some psychological tests have been the subject of such research.

The standard guidelines for interpreting effect size state that 
 0.2 is a small difference;
 0.5 is medium difference, one that would be noticeable to a casual observer;
 0.8 is large difference, one that would be obvious to a casual observer.

Self-report scales

Objective tests

References 

Tests by gender difference